Syagrus sehranus is a species of leaf beetle from Algeria.
It is a replacement name  introduced by N. A. Aslam in 1968 for Syagrus viridicollis Pic, 1942, a junior homonym of Syagrus viridicollis Pic, 1940.

References

Eumolpinae
Beetles of North Africa
Beetles described in 1968